Miroslav Vacek (29 August 1935 – 31 December 2022) was a Czech and Czechoslovakian politician and lieutenant general in the Czechoslovak People's Army. Vacek was the Chief of the General Staff of the Czechoslovak People's Army from 1987 to 1989, coinciding with the end of the Normalization era of communist Czechoslovakia. He then became Minister of National Defence of Czechoslovakia 1989 to 1990 following the Velvet Revolution.

Biography
Vacek, the Chief of the General Staff of the Czechoslovak People's Army from 1987 to 1989, was appointed Minister of National Defence of Czechoslovakia in early December 1989, following the Velvet Revolution. On 15 December 1989, Vacek announced that the military fortifications along the border with West Germany would be removed, noting that he had also begun dismantling facilities along the border with Austria earlier in the week. Vacek and another newly appointed government minister, the ardent anti-communist Foreign Minister Jiří Dienstbier, called for the withdrawal of the 75,000 Soviet troops stationed in Czechoslovakia since the 1968 Warsaw Pact invasion of Czechoslovakia. Vacek also announced a series of reforms for the Czechoslovakian military, including the reduction in the length of mandatory military service from two years to 18 months and an end to control of the military by the Communist Party of Czechoslovakia.

Vacek served as Minister of National Defence from December 1989 to October 1990 under both Prime Ministers Ladislav Adamec and Marián Čalfa.

Vacek retired from the Czechoslovak Army in 1991. He joined the Communist Party of Bohemia and Moravia (KSČM) following the end of communism rule and the dissolution of Czechoslovakia. He was later elected to the Chamber of Deputies of the Czech Republic, serving one term from 1996 to 1999 as a member of the KSČM.

Vacek died at a palliative care facility in Karlovy Vary, Czech Republic on 31 January 2022, at the age of 87.

References

1935 births
2022 deaths
Members of the Chamber of Deputies of the Czech Republic (1996–1998)
Defence Ministers of Czechoslovakia
Chiefs of the General Staff (Czechoslovakia)
Czechoslovak Army officers
Members of the Chamber of the People of Czechoslovakia (1986–1990)
Members of the Federal Assembly of Czechoslovakia (1986–1990)
Communist Party of Bohemia and Moravia MPs
Communist Party of Bohemia and Moravia politicians
Communist Party of Czechoslovakia politicians
People from Kolín
Politicians from Kolín